A. novaehollandiae may refer to:

Accipiter novaehollandiae, the grey goshawk, a bird species
Anhinga novaehollandiae, the Australasian darter, a bird species